Radio Zenit is a Bosnian local commercial radio station, broadcasting from Zenica, Bosnia and Herzegovina. This radio station broadcasts a variety of programs such as pop-rock music and local news.

The owner of the radio station is the company B-U Specijal d.o.o. Zenica.

Radio Zenit was founded on 26 December 1998. Program is mainly produced in Bosnian language at one FM frequency (Zenica ) and it is available in the city of Zenica as well as in nearby municipalities in Zenica-Doboj Canton, Central Bosnia Canton, Sarajevo Canton and even in parts of Herzegovina-Neretva Canton.

Estimated number of listeners of Radio Zenit is around 194.832. Radio station is also available via internet and via IPTV platforms in BiH (Moja TV - Channel 262).

Frequencies
 Zenica

See also 
 List of radio stations in Bosnia and Herzegovina
 Radio Zenica
 Narodni radio Zenica
 Radio Kakanj
 Radio Breza
 Radio Visoko
 Radio Olovo

References

External links 
 www.zenit.ba
 www.radiostanica.ba
 www.fmscan.org
 Communications Regulatory Agency of Bosnia and Herzegovina

Zenica
Radio stations established in 1998
Zenica